The 2011 ABN AMRO World Tennis Tournament was a men's tennis tournament played on indoor hard courts. It was the 38th edition of the event known as the ABN AMRO World Tennis Tournament, and was part of the ATP World Tour 500 series of the 2011 ATP World Tour. It took place at the Rotterdam Ahoy indoor sporting arena in Rotterdam, Netherlands, from February 7 through February 13, 2011. First-seeded Robin Söderling won his second successive singles title.

The field was led by Australian Open finalist Andy Murray, Australian Open semifinalist David Ferrer and defending champion Robin Söderling. Other players included World No. 10 Jürgen Melzer and former top 10 players Ivan Ljubičić, Tommy Robredo, and Mikhail Youzhny.

Finals

Singles

 Robin Söderling defeated  Jo-Wilfried Tsonga, 6–3, 3–6, 6–3.
It was Soderling's second title of the year, eighth of his career, and his second consecutive win at the event.

Doubles

 Jürgen Melzer /  Philipp Petzschner defeated  Michaël Llodra /  Nenad Zimonjić, 6–4, 3–6, [10–5].

Wheelchair singles

 Ronald Vink defeated  Stéphane Houdet, 7–5, 6–1

Wheelchair doubles

The tournament was played in a round robin format with  Robin Ammerlaan and  Stéphane Houdet won the league.

Entrants

Seeds

1 Rankings as of January 31, 2011.

Other entrants
The following players received wildcards into the main draw:
  Robin Haase
  Jesse Huta Galung
  Thomas Schoorel

The following players received entry from the qualifying draw:

  Grigor Dimitrov
  Benoît Paire
  Dmitry Tursunov
  Mischa Zverev

The following players received entry as a lucky loser into the singles main draw:
  Philipp Petzschner

References

External links
 Official website
 ATP tournament profile
 ITF tournament edition details

 
ABN AMRO World Tennis Tournament
ABN AMRO World Tennis Tournament
ABN AMRO World Tennis Tournament